The I Marine Expeditionary Force ("I" pronounced "One") is a Marine Air Ground Task Force (MAGTF) of the United States Marine Corps primarily composed of the 1st Marine Division, 3rd Marine Aircraft Wing, and 1st Marine Logistics Group. It is based at Marine Corps Base Camp Pendleton.

I Marine Expeditionary Force is the largest of the three MEFs in the Fleet Marine Force and is often referred to as the "Warfighting MEF" for its consistent involvement and contributions in major armed conflicts. It is presently commanded by Lt. Gen. George W. Smith Jr. The deputy commander is Brig. Gen. Ryan S. Rideout.

Etymology
Pronunciation of the Roman numeral designator: As a Roman numeral the capital letter "I", representing one, is properly pronounced as "One". However, there are some who erroneously pronounce the number as either "First", or either intentionally, or unknowingly, pronounce it as "Eye", as in the letter "I".

The convention of using Roman numerals to designate a MEF, which is itself the Marine Corps equivalent organization to an Army corps, stems from the U.S. Army practice that began in the American Civil War, and continues today, of numbering corps (two or more divisions with supporting troops, and sometimes including separate brigades, regiments, groups, or battalions, all under a unified corps headquarters, usually commanded by a lieutenant general) with Roman numerals. Corps, themselves being the first-level sub-unit of a "field army", or a numbered, or named, army (e.g., First U.S. Army, or the Army of the Potomac).

During the First World War, the 4th Marine Brigade, as part of the U.S. Army 2nd Infantry Division, came under the U.S. Army I Corps, American Expeditionary Forces. With the expansion of the Marine Corps to six divisions and five air wings during the Second World War, the Marine Corps created two "Amphibious Corps", I Marine Amphibious Corps (later re-designated as III Amphibious Corps) and V Amphibious Corps, continuing the custom begun by the Army. Modern Marine Expeditionary Forces, or MEFs (for a time known as Marine Amphibious [italics added] Forces, or MABs) continue the U.S. Marine Corps legacy as corps-equivalent organizations designated by Roman numerals.

Mission
When directed, I MEF deploys and is employed as a Marine Air Ground Task Force (MAGTF) in support of Combatant Commander (COCOM) requirements for contingency response or Major Theater War; with appropriate augmentation, serves as the core element of a Joint Task Force (JTF); prepares and deploys combat-ready MAGTF's to support COCOM presence and crisis response; and supports service and COCOM initiatives as required.

Lineage

Activated on 8 November 1969 at Okinawa, Japan as the I Marine Expeditionary Force
Redesignated on 18 August 1970 as the I Marine Amphibious Force (I MAF)
Relocated in April 1971 to Camp Pendleton, California
Redesignated on 5 February 1988 as the "I Marine Expeditionary Force"

Structure

Units
 Ground combat element: 1st Marine Division
 Aviation combat element: 3rd Marine Air Wing
 Logistics combat element: 1st Marine Logistics Group
 Command element: I Marine Expeditionary Force Information Group
 I MEF Support Battalion
 1st Intelligence Battalion
 1st Radio Battalion
 9th Communication Battalion
 1st Air Naval Gunfire Liaison Company (ANGLICO)
 1st Marine Expeditionary Brigade
 11th Marine Expeditionary Unit
 13th Marine Expeditionary Unit
 15th Marine Expeditionary Unit

Recent service

      
Operation Desert Shield – Southwest Asia – August 1990 – April 1991 
Operation Desert Storm – Southwest Asia – August 1990 – April 1991 
Operation Restore Hope- December 1992 – May 1993
Operation Southern Watch – Iraq – January 1998 – February 1998
Operation Desert Thunder – Iraq – February 1998 – June 1998
Operation Enduring Freedom – Kuwait, Afghanistan – November 2002
Operation Iraqi Freedom – Iraq – March 2003 – 2010

List of commanders

References

External links

I MEF official website

Corps of the United States Marine Corps